From Language to Language (Hebrew: משפה לשפה, tr. MiSafa LeSafa) is a 55-minute 2004 Belgian-French-German-Israeli Hebrew-language independent underground experimental documentary art film directed by Nurith Aviv.

Synopsis
It contains interviews with Israeli artists and writers such as Aharon Appelfeld, Evgenia Dodina, Salman Masalha, Agi Mishol, Amal Murkus, Prof. Dr. Haviva Pedaya, Haïm Ulliel, and Meir Wieseltier who write in Hebrew even though it is not their native language about the importance of language and asks how the struggle between their mother tongue and Hebrew has affected their art.

Reception
Between its release and 2006, the film was screened and won several awards at DocAviv, Marseille Festival of Documentary Film, Visions du Réel, Internationales Dokumentarfilmfestival München, Musée d’Art et d’Histoire du Judaïsme, Centre culturel international de Cerisy-la-Salle, Israel Psychoanalytic Society, Strasbourg Museum of Modern and Contemporary Art, Martin-Gropius-Bau, University of Lausanne, and many other places. It was also screened at Centre Georges Pompidou in 2015.

References

External links
From Language to Language at Nurith Aviv’s Official Website 

From Language to Language Film Trailer at Éditions Montparnasse’s Website 

2000s avant-garde and experimental films
2004 documentary films
2004 independent films
2004 films
Belgian avant-garde and experimental films
Belgian documentary films
Belgian independent films
Documentary films about Israel
Documentary films about women
Documentary films about words and language
Documentary films about writers
Films directed by Nurith Aviv
Films set in Israel
Films shot in Israel
French avant-garde and experimental films
French documentary films
French independent films
German avant-garde and experimental films
German documentary films
German independent films
2000s Hebrew-language films
Israeli avant-garde and experimental films
Israeli documentary films
Israeli independent films
2000s French films
2000s German films